Yemeni diaspora refers to Yemeni migrants and their descendants who, whether by choice or coercion, emigrated from Yemen and now reside in other countries.

There are 7 million Yemenis living outside Yemen, including 2 million in Saudi Arabia. In the United Kingdom there are between 70,000 and 80,000 Yemenis. An estimated 10,000 Yemenis in Birmingham, making about 1% of the city's population. Over 200,000 Yemenis reside in the United States, and around 3,000 live in Italy. Other Yemenis also reside in the United Arab Emirates, Jordan, Qatar and Bahrain, as well as Indonesia, Malaysia, Brunei, and the former USSR.

A smaller number of modern-day Indonesians are of Yemeni descent, their original ancestors having left Yemen for the Southeast Asia over four centuries ago.

Due to the conflict in Yemen, many have migrated to the northern coasts of Djibouti, Somalia and Ethiopia. In 2017, Djibouti was home to over 40,000 Yemeni refugees.

Yemenite Jews in Israel

Almost 435,000 Yemenite Jews live in Israel. Yemenite Jews have a unique religious tradition that marks them out as separate from Ashkenazi, Sephardi and other Jewish groups. Yemenite Jews are generally described as belonging to "Mizrahi Jews", though they differ from the general trend of Mizrahi groups in Israel, which have undergone a process of total or partial assimilation to Sephardic culture and Sephardic liturgy.

Avigdor Kahalani originating from Yemen was a former Israeli soldier and politician and Israeli Minister of Internal Security and member of the Knesset, the Israeli Parliament. Ofra Haza was a famous Israeli singer most known for "Im Nin'alu" and for representing Israel in the Eurovision Song Contest 1983 with "Hi". Dana International of mixed Yemeni and Romanian origin won Eurovision Song Contest 1998 representing Israel with "Diva". Both Haza and Dana International have also sung in Arabic and in Yemeni dialects. Bo'az Ma'uda also of Yemeni descent represented Israel in Eurovision Song Contest 2008 with "The Fire in Your Eyes".

Very active names of Yemeni (or partial Yemeni) origin particularly in Israeli Mizrahi music include Zohar Argov, Daklon, Eyal Golan, Zion Golan, Yishai Levi, Avihu Medina, Haim Moshe, Shimi Tavori, Margalit Tzan'ani amongst others.

Notable Yemenis of the diaspora

Sadam Ali, American boxer
Hakim Almasmari, Yemeni American journalist, editor of Yemen Post
Sharifa Alkhateeb, American writer, researcher and teacher on cultural communication and community building for Islam and Muslims in the United States, of mixed Yemeni Czech origin
Naseem Hamed, British boxer
Norman Hassan, British musician, member of UB40
Ilhan Omar, Somali American politician and legislator from Minnesota of Yemeni descent
Adam Saleh, American entrepreneur, vlogger, musician of Yemeni descent
Jade Thirlwall, member of English band Little Mix
Khalid Yafai, British boxer
Gamal Yafai, British boxer
Queen Naija, American Artist

References

See also
Demographics of Yemen
Yemenis in the United Kingdom
Yemeni Americans
Yemenite Jews

 
Diaspora
 Arab diaspora